Fanny Riberot (born 17 March 1983) is a French former racing cyclist. She finished in third place at the French National Road Race Championships in 2012 and 2014.

Major results

2003
 2nd Overall Tour de Charente-Maritime
2005
 3rd Time trial, National Under-23 Road Championships
2006
 1st Cholet Pays de Loire Dames
2012
 3rd Road race, National Road Championships
 8th Cholet Pays de Loire Dames
2013
 4th Cholet Pays de Loire Dames
2014
 3rd Road race, National Road Championships
2015
 3rd Tour of Chongming Island World Cup

References

External links

1983 births
Living people
French female cyclists
Sportspeople from Agen
Cyclists at the 2015 European Games
European Games competitors for France
Cyclists from Nouvelle-Aquitaine